Jean-Pierre Bosser (born 14 November 1959 in Versailles, France) is a French Army General. He was Chief of Staff of the French Army from 1 September 2014 to 31 July 2019.

Military career 

Student of the Lycée militaire de Saint-Cyr, then the École spéciale militaire de Saint-Cyr (promotion Général Lasalle 1979-1981), he chose then the infantry application school at Montpellier.
 
He served in the 8th Marine Infantry Parachute Regiment 8e RPIMa at Castres on three different occasions, as a section (platoon) chief and paratrooper instructor from 1982 to 1985, assistant officer then commandant of a company between 1986 and 1990, and finally after being nominated to colonel on 1 October 2000, in quality as a regimental commander from 2003 to 2011. Jean-Pierre Bosser was particularly renowned for becoming a paratrooper instructor, particularly at the 8th Parachute Regiment of the Troupes de marine, and participated to a dozen of exterior operations.

Between 1982 and 1990, he deployed to Lebanon at the corps of the Multinational Force in Lebanon since creation in September 1982, to Tchad for the launching of Operation Manta in 1983 then within the cadre of Opération Épervier in 1989, to Central African Republic in 1984 and 1986, and to Gabon in 1990 for the evacuation of French citizens from Port-Gentil. He also conducted simultaneously a technical military assistance mission for one year as a counselor of the para-commando battalion of Mauritania in 1985.

From 1990 to 1992, he occupied the post of chief of the operational center of the inter-arm general staff headquarters of the superior commandment of the New Caledonian Armed Forces (FANC). He was then engaged at the head of his regiment in Kosovo within the cadre of Operation Trident in 2002, then Central African Republic to open Operation Boali in 2003. Brevetted at the École de guerre in 1996, he served for five years at the bureau « études générales » of the Directorate of Military Personnel of the French Army (DPMAT) before assuming the command of the 8e RPIMa. Then, from 2003 till 2005, he was designated as director of the student formations (DFE) of Écoles de Saint-Cyr Coëtquidan ESCC.

He joined again the DPMAT in quality as a bureau chief « Arme de mêlée », then bureau chief « études générales ». Nominated to Général de brigade on 1 August 2007, he became the assistant to the deputy chief of the general staff headquarters  « ressources humaines » at the general staff headquarters of the French Army where he was confined with the functions of deputy chief of the general staff headquarters  « performance-synthèse ». Elevated to the rank designation of général de corps d’armée, he became on 29 November 2012, the director of the Protection and Defense Security Directorate DPSD, while being responsible for one of the French Military Intelligence Subsidiaries.

On 9 July 2014, he was nominated by the Council of Ministers Chief of Staff of the French Army CEMAT, the highest function in the chain of command of the French Army. He assumed this post responsibility on 1 September 2014 along with the rank elevation designation of Général d'armée.

Military ranks

Honours and decorations

Jean-Pierre Bosser is an Honorary Corporal (bestowed) of the French Foreign Legion.

See also
Hervé Charpentier
Chief of the Defence Staff
Bruno Dary
Elrick Irastorza
François Lecointre
Benoit Puga
31st Brigade (France)
Pierre de Villiers

Notes and references

1959 births
Living people
French generals
École Spéciale Militaire de Saint-Cyr alumni
Grand Officiers of the Légion d'honneur
Commanders of the Ordre national du Mérite
Recipients of the Cross for Military Valour
Commanders Crosses of the Order of Merit of the Federal Republic of Germany
Commanders of the Legion of Merit